is a railway station in the city of Ishinomaki, Miyagi Prefecture, Japan, operated by East Japan Railway Company (JR East).

Lines
Wabuchi Station is served by the Kesennuma Line, and is located 3.2 kilometers from the terminus of the line at Maeyachi Station.

Station layout
The station has one side platform serving a single bi-directional line. The station is unattended.

History
Wabuchi Station opened on 24 October 1968. The station was absorbed into the JR East network upon the privatization of the Japanese National Railways (JNR) on 1 April 1987.

Surrounding area
Miyagi Prefectural Road 21
Wabuchi Post Office

See also
 List of railway stations in Japan

External links

 
  video of a train trip from Rikuzen-Toyosato Station to Maeyachi Station in 2009, passing Nonodake Station at around 03:35 minutes and Wabuchi Station at around 05:48 minutes, without stopping.

Railway stations in Miyagi Prefecture
Kesennuma Line
Railway stations in Japan opened in 1968
Stations of East Japan Railway Company
Ishinomaki